Sarcohyla ameibothalame is a species of frog in the family Hylidae. It is endemic to northwestern Oaxaca, Mexico.
Its natural habitats are montane oak forest. They can use bromeliads as refuges. Tadpoles have been found in a small stream. It is presumably threatened by habitat loss and might become threatened by chytridiomycosis.

References

ameibothalame
Endemic amphibians of Mexico
Fauna of the Sierra Madre del Sur
Amphibians described in 2002
Taxonomy articles created by Polbot